Kill Squad is a 1982 American martial arts action film written and directed by Patrick G. Donahue and starring Jean Glaudé and Cameron Mitchell.

Plot 
After a home invasion leaves Joseph Lawrence in a wheelchair and his wife dead, Joseph asks his friend Larry to assemble the other 5 members of their old squad to help him track down the criminals.  A flashback reveals Joseph, Larry, and the five other members of the squad were prisoners of war in the Vietnam War. Joseph earned the loyalty of the unit by stepping on a land mine while the others escaped.

Since the end of the war, the members of the squad have gone their separate ways but when Larry tells each one that "Joseph needs them," they each immediately agree to help their friend. After they assemble and show their skills, Larry informs the team that a rival electronics company owner by the name of Dutch may be responsible for the attack on Joseph.

As the squad attempts to track down Dutch, a sniper mysteriously appearing and kills them one by one until Larry and Joseph are the only squad members left. Larry finally learns where Dutch but when confronted, Dutch is accidentally killed by one of his house guests.

Upon returning to Joseph's house, the mysterious masked sniper appears. As Larry takes on the sniper, the horrible truth is revealed: Joseph was the mastermind of his own attack. Joseph explains that he resented the squad for his losing his leg in the land mine explosion and that his wife was the owner of the business. Joseph planned the murder of his wife to gain control of the business and faked being paralyzed to lure his squad mates back for revenge.

Joseph attacks Larry with an axe but Larry dodges, leaving the axe embedded in a fence. Larry then accidentally kicks Joseph into the axe which kills him.

Cast 

 Cameron Mitchell as Dutch
   Jean Glaudé as Larry Pearson 
 Jeff Risk as Joseph Lawrence
 Jerry Johnson as K.C.
 Francisco Ramírez as Pete
 Bill Cambra as Alan
 Gary Fung 	 as Tommy
 Marc Sabin as Arthur
 Alan Marcus as Jessie James 
 Sean P. Donahue as Billy

See also 
 List of American films of 1982
 List of martial arts films

References

External links 

 https://www.imdb.com/name/nm0322166/

1982 action films
American action films
1982 martial arts films
1982 films
American martial arts films
1980s English-language films
1980s American films